Inés Delpech (born 27 August 1994) is an Argentinian field hockey player.

Hockey career 
In 2020, Delpech was called into the senior national women's team.

References

Argentine female field hockey players
Living people
1994 births
People from Tandil
Sportspeople from Buenos Aires Province
Competitors at the 2022 South American Games
South American Games silver medalists for Argentina
South American Games medalists in field hockey
21st-century Argentine women